Chromeo is a Canadian electro-funk duo from Montreal, formed in 2002 by musicians David "Dave 1" Macklovitch and Patrick "P-Thugg" Gemayel. Their sound draws from blue-eyed soul, dance music, rock, synth-pop, disco and funk.

, the band has released five studio albums, with three of them hitting the Billboard 200 charts. In 2018, Chromeo received their first Grammy Award nomination for Best Engineered Album, Non-Classical in the 61st Grammy Awards for their album Head over Heels.

History
The duo met in the mid-1990s at Collège Stanislas in Montreal. Speaking on their different ethnic backgrounds, the two jokingly describe themselves as "the only successful Arab/Jewish partnership since the dawn of human culture."

Around the time when they were both 15, Macklovitch joined Gemayel's band. During this time, Macklovitch's younger brother A-Trak (of Duck Sauce) started winning the Disco Mix Club Championships, becoming World Champion in 1997. After the band, Dave 1 and P-Thugg started to produce hip hop music together. Also at this time, Tiga was working with Dave 1 at a record store and asked Dave 1 to work on a project for his label, Turbo. Dave 1 and P-Thugg signed as Chromeo and started creating music together.

Reviews of their 2004 debut album, She's in Control, were mostly favorable. Critics compared the sound to 1980s groups Hall & Oates, Zapp, Prince, Klymaxx and Sylvester. "Needy Girl" became a worldwide club hit. According to Dave 1, "She's in Control didn't blow up. But we had "Needy Girl", and "Needy Girl" was like a musical passport. That song went all around the world and DJs played it everywhere". The song "You're So Gangsta" was featured as the theme tune for the PC game Space Colony.

In 2005, Chromeo released a mix CD of funky dance tracks on Eskimo Belgium records entitled Un Joli Mix Pour Toi (French for: A Nice Mix for You). In 2006, the group was featured in DJ Mehdi's song "I Am Somebody". During early 2007, Chromeo supported indie rock group Bloc Party on their British tour.

After a three-year break, they released a second album, Fancy Footwork, which also received positive reviews. In 2008, Chromeo performed with Daryl Hall as a part of his online series Live from Daryl's House. They also performed with Hall at the 2010 Bonnaroo Music & Arts Festival in Manchester, TN. On a 2009 episode of Yo Gabba Gabba!, Chromeo appeared performing original song "Nice 'N Clean".

Chromeo released their third studio album, Business Casual, on September 14, 2010. As of 2023, the music video for the album's single "Night by Night" had received over 5.6 million views on YouTube. The band has appeared on KCRW's Morning Becomes Eclectic, been on the cover of Future Magazine, and sold out The Forum in London.

At the beginning of March 2011, Chromeo sent out notice that they had recorded the "world's smallest album", entitled Drive Time, which consists of 55 songs in only 183 seconds. About a week later, it was revealed that Drive Time is actually a free musical Nokia Own Voice satellite navigation pack for Ovi Maps, made for usage with Nokia's compatible cell phones. A red vinyl 5" single consisting of regular, instrumental and a cappella versions of "Turn Left" and "Follow" was released to promote it, with a sticker on the shrink wrap saying that it was a numbered limited edition of 40 copies.

In September 2013, the group announced their fourth studio album White Women with a trailer video featuring the track "Over Your Shoulder". It was released May 9, 2014, in Ireland and May 12 elsewhere.

Chromeo performed at the Coachella Valley Music and Arts Festival in April 2014.

On November 2, 2017, Chromeo announced a new album called Head Over Heels. The first single "Juice" was released on November 7, 2017. In December of 2018, Chromeo received their first Grammy nomination for Best Engineered Album, Non-Classical in the 61st Grammy Awards for the album.

On May 4, 2020, Chromeo announced the launch of its own record label, "Juliet Records" via Facebook.

On June 12, 2021, the live album Date Night: Chromeo Live! was announced for release on June 25, alongside the release of the single "Don’t Sleep (Live in Washington D.C.)". Tracks were recorded during a 2019 North America concert tour, where Chromeo had performed live with a full band for the first time.

Members
 Dave 1 (real name David Macklovitch, born June 7, 1978) on guitar and lead vocals. Macklovitch is a Ph.D. candidate in French Literature at Columbia University and is currently appointed as lecturer in French at Barnard College.

 P-Thugg (real name Patrick Gemayel, born in Lebanon on July 31, 1977) on keyboards, synthesizers, bass guitar, and talk box. He moved to Canada at the age of eight.

Discography

 She's in Control (2004)
 Fancy Footwork (2007)
 Business Casual (2010)
 White Women (2014)
 Head over Heels (2018)
 Quarantine Casanova (EP) (2020)
 Date Night: Chromeo Live! (Live album, 2021)

Awards and nominations

References

External links

 

2002 establishments in Quebec
Atlantic Records artists
Canadian disco groups
Canadian funk musical groups
Canadian musical duos
Canadian synthpop groups
Dance-rock musical groups
Electronic music duos
English-language musical groups from Quebec
Musical groups established in 2002
Musical groups from Montreal
Nu-disco musicians
Nettwerk Music Group artists
V2 Records artists
Male musical duos